Virgin Australia Regional Airlines is an Australian regional airline based in Perth, servicing key towns in the state of Western Australia. The airline also flies interstate to destinations such as Adelaide, Darwin, Melbourne and Alice Springs. Formerly known as Skywest, in April 2013 the airline was purchased by Virgin Australia Holdings as its new regional offshoot. On 21 April 2020, Virgin Australia Regional Airlines' parent company, Virgin Australia Holdings went into voluntary administration due to the COVID-19 pandemic.

History

Early years
Virgin Australia Regional was formed in 1963 as Carnarvon Air Taxis flying charter flights with small general aviation aircraft out of Carnarvon, Western Australia. In 1979 it changed its name to Skywest Aviation and moved to Perth's Jandakot Airport. In 1980 Skywest Airlines was formed (ICAO code OZW), based at Perth Airport, and acquired Stillwell Airlines and its routes; the combined fleet included 39 aircraft, making it the second largest commuter airline in Australia at the time. The Skywest Airlines fleet included a mix of general aviation types and small airliners including GAF N-24 Nomads, Embraer EMB 110 Bandeirantes, Beechcraft King Air 200s and Fairchild SA-227 Metro IIIs, as well as smaller types such as Cessna 182 Skylanes and Piper Aztecs.

In 1982, the controlling companies merged Skywest Airlines with Transwest Airlines. At the time Skywest operated 16 aircraft and TransWest 25.

Then in 1983, it was proposed to merge Skywest with East-West Airlines, both were owned by the Devereaux group.  The merger did not eventuate, but east–west operated flights in Western Australia on Skywest's behalf. In 1987 Skywest lost the Government Coastwatch contract, which severely weakened the business.  The company was bought out by the Perron group and then on-sold shortly thereafter to TNT/News Limited and began operating under the Ansett banner.  The east–west aircraft were divested for operations in Queensland and were later absorbed into Ansett. At this time, Skywest was operating most of its services with five BAe Jetstream 31s.

In 1998, Ansett introduced Fokker 50s into Skywest service.

Development since the 2000s
The airline continued to be owned by Ansett Australia, and operated flights on behalf of Ansett until the parent's demise in 2002. Skywest was then successfully purchased by private investors. In 2004 it was the subject of a hostile, but ultimately successful, takeover attempt by Singapore-based investment company CaptiveVision Capital.  This takeover succeeded in gaining a majority stake.  On 8 February 2007, news broke that the airline may be the target of a tie-up with Singapore-based Tiger Airways, although no business arrangements were ever concluded. Between 2004 and 2012 Skywest Airlines was entirely owned by CaptiveVision Capital which in turn was a subsidiary of ASX and London Stock Exchange AIM market-quoted Skywest Airlines.

Since 2004 under Skywest Airlines ownership, the fleet expanded from seven aircraft to 18 aircraft. Skywest's first Airbus A320 was registered in April 2010. It was delivered Perth on 23 October 2010 and operated charter services between Perth and Cloudbreak for Fortescue Metals Group. Skywest announced that it had optioned a second A320 on 12 May 2011.

On 10 January 2011, it was announced that Virgin Australia had established a 10-year alliance under which Skywest would operate up to 18 turboprops in the bigger carrier's colours. The alliance with the Perth-based airline was part of new push by Virgin Australia into regional Australia. The agreement saw the airlines codeshare on some of each other's flights. Virgin Australia and Skywest customers also could earn and redeem frequent flyer points on each other's networks. The aircraft were leased from  plc with the first four arriving in 2011.

In April 2012, Virgin Australia Holdings purchased 10% of Skywest Airlines, followed by a full takeover bid on 30 October 2012. It had received in principle support from the Board but the takeover would require shareholder and regulatory approval. On 11 April 2013, Virgin Australia Holdings completed its 100% acquisition of Skywest Airlines. From 7 May 2013, the use of the Skywest brand was discontinued and the airline became part of the Virgin Australia brand, however it continues to operate under its current Air Operator's Certificate and its own management team.

2022 Fleet changes and transition to Parent 
In April 2022, Virgin Australia announced its plans to phase out the Fokker 100 aircraft, and replace it with 10 year old Boeing 737-700s leased from KLM Royal Dutch Airlines. These will be operated by Virgin Australia's AOC for Virgin Australia Regional Airlines, leaving the Airbus A320 fleet solely operated by Virgin Australia Regional Airlines. The Group currently operates 10 x F100 aircraft across its operations in Western Australia, with the F100 fleet to be gradually transitioned out and replaced by 737-700s from first quarter 2023.

Virgin Australia Regional Airlines is expected to merge into the Parent company, Virgin Australia, from 2024.

Destinations

Scheduled flights
As of July 2018, Virgin Australia Regional Airlines operated scheduled flights to the following destinations:

 South Australia
 Adelaide – Adelaide Airport
 Northern Territory
 Darwin – Darwin International Airport
 Alice Springs – Alice Springs Airport
 Victoria
 Melbourne – Melbourne Airport
 Western Australia
 Broome – Broome International Airport
 Kalgoorlie – Kalgoorlie Airport
 Karratha – Karratha Airport
 Kununurra – Kununurra Airport
 Newman – Newman Airport
 Onslow – Onslow Airport
 Perth – Perth Airport Main Hub – T2 & T1
 Port Hedland – Port Hedland International Airport
 Indian Ocean Territories
 Christmas Island – Christmas Island Airport
 Cocos (Keeling) Islands – Cocos (Keeling) Islands Airport

Terminated destinations
 Indonesia
 Denpasar, Bali – I Gusti Ngurah Rai International Airport
 Western Australia
 Albany – Albany Airport
 Busselton – Busselton Airport
 Carnarvon – Carnarvon Airport
 Derby – RAAF Curtin
 Esperance – Esperance Airport
 Exmouth – Learmonth Airport
 Geraldton – Geraldton Airport
 Kalbarri – Kalbarri Airport
 Monkey Mia – Shark Bay Airport
 Ravensthorpe – Ravensthorpe Airport
 Paraburdoo – Paraburdoo Airport
 Queensland
 Cairns – Cairns Airport
 Townsville – Townsville Airport

Since Virgin Australia's take over, two original WA Coastal Network (Skywest) destinations have been cancelled (Exmouth & Busselton) with Albany, Esperance and Ravensthorpe also ending on 27 February 2016.

Contract flights
In addition to scheduled flights, Virgin Australia Regional has contracts with various mining companies to service the burgeoning Western Australian mining industry; via regular fly-in fly-out air charter flights to remote minesites. These contracts include flights between:
 Perth and West Angelas mine for Rio Tinto
 Perth and Barimunya, also known as Yandi for BHP Billiton and Rio Tinto
 Perth and Coondewanna, also known as Area C, the sister site to Barimunya for BHP Billiton
 Perth and Boolgeeda, also known as Brockman for Rio Tinto
 Busselton and West Angelas for Rio Tinto
 Busselton and Barimunya for Rio Tinto
 Albany and Barimunya for Rio Tinto
 Geraldton and Paraburdoo via Boolgeeda
 Perth and Argyle
 Perth and Windarling on behalf of Portman Iron Ore
 Perth and The Granites minesite in the Tanami Desert on behalf of Newmont Tanami
 Perth and Ravensthorpe Nickel Mine with First Quantum Minerals.
 Various ports in the East Coast of Australia under contract to Virgin Australia commencing 2011.

Skywest previously held a contract to fly staff to Telfer, however in December 2010 this contract was terminated in favour of a contract with Alliance Airlines.
On 27 April 2012, Skywest finished flying to Fortescue Dave Forrest Airport (Cloudbreak Airport) for Fortescue Metals group, after losing the contract to Qantas' fly-in-fly-out-charter subsidiary Network Aviation.

International charters
Commencing in 2004, Island Bound Holidays chartered a Skywest Fokker 100 to undertake flights to Bali from Port Hedland. In 2010 Skywest commenced operation of scheduled services to Bali from Port Hedland. Skywest also offered flights from Geraldton to Bali in 2011.

Fleet

As of March 2023, the Virgin Australia Regional fleet consists of the following aircraft:

The fleet is used significantly in the Australian state of Western Australia, including a number of charter services which support the growing regional centres. Flights to other destinations such as Adelaide, Darwin and Alice Springs also take place. All aircraft are fitted in an all-economy seat layout. Virgin Australia Regional's Airbus A320-200 fleet can often be seen operating flights to and from Melbourne, although the majority of their flights are supporting the growing Fokker 100 network in Western Australia and neighbouring states. Since March 2022, all of the A320s that are currently in the fleet were from the now defunct Tigerair Australia, which was a fully owned subsidiary of Virgin Australia Holdings.

Loyalty Program
In November 2007, Skywest joined Virgin Blue's loyalty program Velocity Rewards (now called Velocity). Velocity Points can be earned on all Virgin Australia Regional flights, excluding charter flights. Points awarded vary from 0.5 per mile to one per mile, depending on fare class.

Accidents & incidents
On 13 May 1980, a Skywest Swearingen Metro II experienced a failure of its right engine at low altitude whilst approaching Esperance Airport during a scheduled passenger flight, forcing the pilot to execute an emergency landing in a nearby field. The single crewmember and all eleven passengers on board evacuated the aircraft before it was destroyed in a fire.

References

External links

 

Airlines established in 1963
Companies that filed for Chapter 11 bankruptcy in 2020
Airlines of Western Australia
Ansett Australia
Companies based in Perth, Western Australia
Regional Aviation Association of Australia
A
Former Star Alliance affiliate members
Australian companies established in 1963